Lubero Airport  is an airport serving the city of Lubero in North Kivu Province, Democratic Republic of the Congo.

Lubero is in a basin, and the airport has nearby rising terrain to the north, and distant rising terrain in all other quadrants.

See also

Transport in the Democratic Republic of the Congo
List of airports in the Democratic Republic of the Congo

References

External links
 OpenStreetMap - Lubero Airport
 FallingRain - Lubero
 HERE Maps - Lubero
 OurAirports - Lubero
 

Airports in North Kivu